is a former Japanese football player.

Playing career
Hasumi was born in Nishitokyo on June 6, 1972. He joined Yomiuri (later Verdy Kawasaki) from youth team in 1991. However he could not play at all in the match in top team. In 1996, he moved to Japan Football League club Fujitsu and played many matches. In 1997, he moved to Tokyo Gas. He played as regular player and the club won the champions in 1998 season. In 1999, he moved to J2 League club Vegalta Sendai. Although he could not play many matches in first season, he became a regular player from 2000 season. The club won the 2nd place in 2001 and was promoted to J1 League. However he retired end of 2001 season without playing at J1 League.

Club statistics

References

External links

1972 births
Living people
Association football people from Tokyo Metropolis
Japanese footballers
Japan Soccer League players
J1 League players
J2 League players
Japan Football League (1992–1998) players
Tokyo Verdy players
Kawasaki Frontale players
FC Tokyo players
Vegalta Sendai players
Association football midfielders
People from Nishitōkyō, Tokyo